(1775-1840) was a Japanese samurai of the Edo period. A senior retainer of the Sendai domain. Kagesada was the tenth Katakura Kojūrō. His childhood name was Sannosuke (三之助) later Kojuro. His father was Katakura Muratsune and his son was Katakura Munekage.

External links
Katakura family tree (in Japanese)
Katakura-related timeline (in Japanese)

Samurai
Katakura clan